Bruno Tarimo (born 16 June 1995) is a Tanzanian professional boxer and current Champion of International Boxing Federation International Super Feather title and Interim World Boxing Association Oceania Super Feather title. Tarimo resides in Southport, Queensland, Australia.

Professional boxing career
Tarimo made his professional debut against Abdul Ali on 25 December 2013. He won the fight by a third-round technical knockout. He amassed a 23–2–1 record during the next six years. He won the Tanzania, WBA Oceania and IBF Pan Pacfic super featherweight titles during this run.

Tarimo was booked to face Serif Gurdijeljac for the vacant IBF International super featherweight title on 31 August 2019, at the Hala Pendik in Novi Pazar, Serbia, which was his first fight outside of Australia and Tanzania. He won the fight by split decision. Two judges scored the fight 115–110 and 118–110 for Tarimo, while the third judge scored it 115–111 for Gurdijeljac.

Tarimo made his first IBF International title defense against Nathaniel May on 6 December 2019, at the ICC Exhibition Centre in Sydney, Australia. He won the fight by unanimous decision, with two judges scoring the fight 98–92 in his favor, while the third judge scored the fight 97–93 for him. Tarimo made his second IBF International title defense against Paul Fleming on 16 December 2020, at the Bankwest Stadium in Parramatta, Australia. The interim WBA Oceania super featherweight title was on the line as well. The fight was ruled a split draw by technical decision after the third round, as Fleming was unable to continue competing due to a head cut on Fleming, which was caused by an accidental clash of heads. Tarimo made his third IBF title defense against Kye MacKenzie on 21 April 2021, at the WIN Entertainment Centre in Wollongong, Australia. He won the fight by unanimous decision.

Tarimo faced the Commonwealth super-featherweight champion Zelfa Barrett in an IBF super featherweight title eliminator on 18 December 2021, at the Manchester Arena. He lost the fight by unanimous decision, with scores of 117–110, 117–110 and 116–111.

On 3 February 2022, Tarimo announced that he would drop down to super bantamweight, stating: "I have made 130 too easily for a long time, and now I want to fight at my real weight".

Professional boxing record

References

External links 
 

1995 births
Living people
Tanzanian male boxers
People from Kilimanjaro Region
Super-featherweight boxers